Walter Fox (10 April 1921 – 2000) was an English professional footballer who played in the Football League for Mansfield Town.

References

1921 births
2000 deaths
English footballers
Association football defenders
English Football League players
Creswell Colliery F.C. players
Mansfield Town F.C. players
Goole Town F.C. players